New Life Church is a nondenominational charismatic evangelical megachurch located in Colorado Springs, Colorado, United States. New Life Church has more than 10,000 members. The church is pastored by Brady Boyd and has multiple congregations that meet throughout the Colorado Springs area. The church is known for its worship music, having produced and released over a dozen worship albums.

Campus and facilities

The church established its present campus location in the early 1990s and added buildings and added onto existing buildings in this location.  The initial sanctuary on the campus, now referred to as the "theater," seats 2,000 and is used primarily for the New Life Friday Night congregation and New Life Kids on Sunday mornings. The current main sanctuary (referred to as the Living Room) can seat over 10,000 but is currently set up to seat 8,000.

The New Life campus is also home to the World Prayer Center.  The World Prayer Team organization, founded global internet-based prayer efforts among its participants out of this building. The World Prayer Team is currently under the direction of Modern Day Missions. The building currently hosts prayer rooms.

The smallest building on the campus is The Tent which is used for various ministry gatherings including the Junior High Sunday Service.

Children's classrooms are in a Bible story-themed area.

New Life Worship 
New Life Church is well known for its prolific songwriters (Ross Parsley, Jon Egan, Glenn Packiam, Jared Anderson, Cory Asbury, Pete Sanchez) and worship leaders, having released over a dozen albums (Over It All, My Savior Lives, Counting On God, You Hold It All, Strong God, Soak) and hundreds of songs (I Am Free, Great I Am, My Savior Lives, Here In Your Presence) through New Life Worship and Desperation Band.

New Life Worship is under the direction of Pete Sanchez while Jon Egan leads most Sundays at New Life North.

Influence

New Life Church, along with Focus on the Family, established Colorado Springs as a conservative evangelical center in the 1990s. In 2005, Jeff Sharlet claimed that while New Life is "by no means the largest megachurch ... [it] holds more sway over the political direction of evangelicalism" than any other church in America.

History 

New Life Church was founded in 1984 by Ted Haggard. The church started under his leadership as an independent church meeting in his home. From these origins, the church grew through a succession of larger meeting spaces including strip mall office space and other non-traditional church locations.

Ted Haggard scandals and resignation

On November 2, 2006, Haggard was accused of paying a male escort for sex for three years and of also using methamphetamine. Later the same day, Haggard voluntarily stepped down as pastor so "the overseer process can be allowed to proceed with integrity", and that he would be seeking "spiritual advice and guidance". Two days later, New Life Church's Board of Overseers announced that they had decided to permanently dismiss Haggard from his role.

In January 2009, new allegations emerged that Haggard, while pastor at New Life, had an inappropriate relationship with a former attendee. Haggard's successor, Brady Boyd, said the church reached a six figure settlement with the man, who was in his early 20s at the time. According to a News Channel 13 report, the man said the contact was "not consensual".

Shooting

On December 9, 2007, Matthew Murray, age 24, opened fire in the New Life Church, striking five people and killing two, sisters Rachel and Stephanie Works; their father David Works was one of the individuals injured. Jeanne Assam, a church security volunteer, shot and wounded the gunman who then killed himself. Several hours prior, the same gunman opened fire at a Youth With A Mission training center in Arvada, Colorado, striking four people and killing two. He was formerly a missionary-in-training with Youth With A Mission and was from a devout Christian family. Police found a letter from the shooter addressed "To God".

In popular culture
Ted Haggard and other members of the church were featured on a 1997 episode of the PRI radio program This American Life, as well as the documentaries Jesus Camp, Friends of God, Constantine's Sword, The Root of All Evil?, and HBO's The Trials of Ted Haggard.

References

External links
 
 Max Blumenthal, The Nightmare of Christianity The Nation (September 9, 2009)

1984 establishments in Colorado
Evangelical churches in Colorado
Evangelical megachurches in the United States
Megachurches in Colorado
Religion in Colorado Springs, Colorado
Christian organizations established in 1984